The Sazonov–Paléologue Agreement was a 26 April 1916 letter from Russian Foreign minister Sergey Sazonov to French ambassador to Russia Maurice Paléologue regarding Western Armenia and the Anglo-French Sykes–Picot Agreement. The agreement for Russia influence over Western Armenia was given in return for Russian assent to the Sykes-Picot arrangement. The agreement took place on the first anniversary of the Treaty of London.

Russia was allocated the vilayets of  Erzurum,  Trebizond, Bitlis and Van; much of which was under Russian occupation at the time.

Bibliography
 The Allies and Armenia, 1915-18, Richard G. Hovannisian, Journal of Contemporary History, Vol. 3, No. 1 (Jan., 1968), pp. 145-168

References

1916 in France
1916 in the Russian Empire
France in World War I
Sykes–Picot Agreement
Imperialism
Ottoman Empire in World War I
Secret treaties
Treaties concluded in 1916
Treaties involving territorial changes
Treaties of the French Third Republic
World War I treaties